The Lumpkin Heights and Elm Ridge Subdivision Historic District is a residential historic district in Mattoon, Illinois. The district encompasses the Lumpkin Heights and Elm Ridge Subdivision neighborhoods in eastern Mattoon. Lumpkin Heights was originally developed as Lafayette Heights in the late nineteenth and early twentieth centuries, and it only became known by its current name after further development in the mid-twentieth century. The Elm Ridge Subdivision was developed entirely within the mid-twentieth century. The original Lafayette Heights section of the district includes examples of many popular architectural styles from the time of its development, with several examples of Colonial Revival, Tudor Revival, and American Craftsman designs. The remainder of the district exhibits trends common in post-World War II residential development, including several Modernist designs, Ranch-style houses, and prefabricated homes.

The district was added to the National Register of Historic Places on December 26, 2017.

References

National Register of Historic Places in Coles County, Illinois
Historic districts on the National Register of Historic Places in Illinois